The 2002 European Karate Championships, the 37th edition, was held in Tallinn, Estonia from 2 to 4 May 2002.

Medallists

Men's competition

Individual

Team

Women's competition

Individual

Team

Medagliere

References

External links
 Karate Records - European Championship 2002

2002
International sports competitions hosted by Estonia
European Karate Championships
European championships in 2002
Sports competitions in Tallinn
21st century in Tallinn
Karate competitions in Estonia
May 2002 sports events in Europe